Gower, as a surname of Welsh or Anglo-Norman origin. Notable people with the surname include:

 Andre Gower (born 1973), American child actor
 Andrew Gower (born 1989), British actor
 Craig Gower (born 1978), Australian rugby footballer
 David Gower (born 1957), English former cricketer
 David Gower (rugby league) (born 1985), Australian Rugby league player
 David J. Gower, palaeontologist
 Erasmus Gower (1742–1814), Welsh naval officer and colonial governor
 Flynn Gower (born 1972), Australian musician with the rock band Cog
 George Gower (c. 1540–1596), English portrait painter
 H. D. G. Leveson Gower (1873–1954), English cricketer
 Henry Gower, fourteenth century canonist, Chancellor of the University of Oxford, and bishop
 Humphrey Gower (1638–1711), English clergyman and academic
 Iris Gower, pen name of novelist Iris Davies (1935–2010)
 Jack Gower, Irish alpine ski racer
 Janice Gower, English bowls player
 Jessica Gower (born 1977), Australian actress
 John Gower (c. 1330–1403), English poet
 John Gower (politician) (1941–2011), American politician from Wisconsin
 Laurence Gower (1913–1967), English lawyer and academic
 Lily Gower (1877–1959), English croquet player
 Luke Gower, Australian musician for rock band Cog and Flynn's brother
 Mark Gower (born 1978), English footballer
 Pauline Gower (1910–1947), British pilot and writer, head of the female branch of the Air Transport Auxiliary during the Second World War
 Patrick Gower (born 1976/1977), a New Zealand journalist and the former editor of Newshub
 Raymond Gower (1916–1989), Welsh Member of Parliament
 Richard Hall Gower (1768–1833), English mariner, empirical philosopher, nautical inventor, entrepreneur, and humanitarian
 Lord Ronald Gower (1845–1916), British aristocrat, Member of Parliament, sculptor and writer
 Rosalie Gower (1931–2013), Canadian civil servant and activist
 Sir Thomas Gower, 2nd Baronet (c. 1605–1672), twice High Sheriff of Yorkshire
 William Gower (born c. 1662), English Member of Parliament

See also
Leveson-Gower, the name of a Scottish noble family
Gowers, another surname